Victor Theodore Stelly (January 11, 1941 – December 26, 2020) was an American politician who was a member of the Louisiana House of Representatives, best known for the since repealed Stelly Plan tax-shifting amendment. He was also a member of the Louisiana Board of Regents for Higher Education from 2007 through 2013, resigning before his term ended because he was dismayed at cuts to higher education.

In 2006, Stelly was selected to the Louisiana Political Hall of Fame.

Political career
Stelly authored an amendment to the Louisiana State Constitution which became known as the Stelly Plan. This amendment eliminated the state sales tax on food, drugs, and utilities and raised the state income tax. Lost state revenue was replaced with a state income tax increase primarily paid by upper bracket taxpayers.

Personal life
Stelly was born in Carencro, Louisiana, and moved to Zachary, Louisiana when he was four years old. His father, Gordon Stelly, was a petro-chemical operator, and his mother Dorothea Olive Martin Stelly, was a stay-at-home mother. He was an All-State football player at Zachary High School and graduated from Northwestern in Natchitoches where he also played football. He taught high school in Louisiana, getting his M.A. from Louisiana State University in 1965. He was an insurance agent for 25 years in Moss Bluff.

Death
Stelly died from COVID-19 complications on December 26, 2020, during the COVID-19 pandemic in Louisiana, just 15 hours before his wife Terry died of the same illness and sixteen days short of his 80th birthday.

His papers are held by the Archives and Special Collections Department of the Frazar Memorial Library at McNeese State University.

References

1941 births
2020 deaths
Louisiana Republicans
Louisiana Independents
Members of the Louisiana House of Representatives
Educators from Louisiana
High school football coaches in Louisiana
Louisiana State University alumni
Deaths from the COVID-19 pandemic in Louisiana
Northwestern State Demons football players